Events in the year 1952 in Portugal.

Incumbents
President: Francisco Craveiro Lopes
Prime Minister: António de Oliveira Salazar

Events
31 March – Gibalta rail accident
1 July – The Portuguese Air Force founded

Arts and entertainment

Sports
14 to 25 February – Portugal had one participant at the 1952 Winter Olympics, where Duarte Silva competed in downhill skiing. It was the first time that Portugal participated in the Winter Olympic Games.

Births
 20 February – João Calvão da Silva, politician (d. 2018)
 4 June - Adelino Teixeira, football coach and former footballer

Deaths

6 September – José Vicente de Freitas, military officer and politician (born in 1869)

References

 
1950s in Portugal
Portugal
Years of the 20th century in Portugal
Portugal